Megachile aurivillii is a species of bee in the family Megachilidae. It was described by Friese in 1901.

References

Aurivillii
Insects described in 1901